"Let's Go All Night" is a 2013 song by Canadian-born house producers James Doman and Antoine Becks with a vocal performance by American singer CeCe Peniston. The single was issued on September 22, 2013 via UK-based Transmission Recordings.

Credits and personnel
 James Doman - performer, producer
 Antoine Toupin  - performer, producer
 Cecilia Peniston - vocals
 Jean-Michel Conti - remix, producer
 Trevor King  - remix, producer
 Rustem Rustem  - remix, producer

Track listing and format
 MD, EU, #TRANS077B
 "Let's Go All Night (Extended Mix)" - 5:43
 "Let's Go All Night (Antoine Becks Remix)" - 6:25
 "Let's Go All Night (Jean-Michel Conti Remix)" - 7:13
 "Let's Go All Night (Electronic Youth Remix)" - 6:48
 "Let's Go All Night (Electronic Youth Dub)" - 6:48

References

General

 Specific

External links 
 

2013 singles
CeCe Peniston songs
2013 songs